Salem block  is a revenue block of Salem district of the Indian state of Tamil Nadu. This revenue block consist of 14 panchayat villages:
 Andipatti
 Ayyamperumampatti
 Chettichavadi
 Dhalavaipatti
 Erumapalayam
 Inamvedugathampatti
 Kondappanaickenpatti
 Majaragollapatti
 Mallamooppampatti

References 

Revenue blocks of Salem district